Sarah Clarke  (born 12 October 1965) is a British administrator. Since 13 February 2018, she has served as Black Rod; the first female Black Rod in the 650-year history of the role. The role is formally, "The Lady Usher of the Black Rod" (for previous incumbents, "Gentleman Usher of the Black Rod"). She is also the first woman to hold the accompanying posts of Serjeant-at-Arms for the House of Lords, Secretary to the Lord Great Chamberlain and to be appointed an Officer of the Order of the Garter.

Before taking this role, she was Championships Director in charge of the administration of The Championships, Wimbledon. She was the first woman to hold this post and the first woman to be a Grand Slam Tournament Director.

On 11 June 2022, she made a rare public speaking appearance in Liverpool, England to address the Annual Meeting of the Women's Institute.

Early life and education
Clarke was born in Wolverhampton, Staffordshire, England. She was educated at Wolverhampton Girls' High School, which was also the alma mater of the first Lord Speaker of the House of Lords. She holds a Bachelor of Science (BSc) degree in Sports Science and Business Studies (1988) from the Roehampton Institute of Higher Education (now the University of Roehampton), a Certificate in Marketing (1993) from the Chartered Institute of Marketing, and a Master of Science (MSc) degree in Risk Crisis and Disaster Management (2005) from the University of Leicester. She was awarded an Honorary Doctorate by the University of Wolverhampton in 2018.

Career in sport 
During a thirty-year career, Clarke held many senior positions and board roles, with a broad operational and strategic remit, delivering complex major events and leading operations in a variety of venues across the UK and abroad. Clarke's first job after graduating was working as an event organiser in Durham. By the mid 1990s, she had progressed to heading up player communications in Europe for the Women’s Tennis Association as senior communications manager, at events across Europe and the Far East. 

She also worked for the Football Association in the operations and events teams for several years and at Wembley Stadium as operations manager in the late 1990s, combining major sports events with large scale concert delivery.

Between 1996 and 2012, she worked on four Olympic Games, including the 2012 Olympic Games in London and was also seconded in 2004 to work on the London Olympic Bid Document. Whilst at UK Sport (2000–2005) she was on the Board of many European and World Championships, including sports such as equestrian, athletics, boxing and football. During this period in 2005, she also was a lead contributor and editor of Major Sports Events: The Guide, working in close collaboration with the wider team at UK Sport.

During the late 1990’s she took a year away from sport and major venues and spent time working for the aid agency Care International.

Clarke worked 32 Championships at Wimbledon; starting as a school leaver in 1986, looking after the Ball Boys and Girls, and was appointed Championships Director in 2013, responsible for overall event planning, management and delivery, security, stewarding, ticketing, public safety, catering and player liaison. She also had involvement with both masterplans and the ongoing site development at Wimbledon.

One of her creations as Championships Director was "The List", an ongoing process of capturing details of areas for consideration and improvement from each championship. Interviewed by The Daily Telegraph in 2017, she commented on their quest for perfection, "We live for details. We love details".

Clarke continues to be involved with annual major events such as the London Marathon and RideLondon and also volunteers each year at the Royal Windsor Horse Show.

Black Rod 
Clarke took up the role as Black Rod in February 2018, succeeding Lieutenant General David Leakey, who retired in December 2017.

Clarke heads a department that plays a significant part in the House of Lords Administration's "front of house" delivery to members and the public, with a key role in the day-to-day running of the House's sittings.

In addition, she is responsible for the organisation and delivery of ceremonial events, such as State Opening and state visits to Westminster and for the daily administration of the King’s residual estate in the Palace of Westminster including the Chapel of St Mary Undercroft, the Robing Room and the Royal Gallery. There are also many smaller annual one-off events, which the department delivers each year.

As a central contact point for members of the House during the day-to-day business, the department has responsibility for facilitating and controlling access to the Chamber and the precincts of the House and maintaining order within them. It also plays a leading part in business resilience. It works closely with the Clerks, Security Department, Facilities Department and the R&R teams, as well as external partners where relevant.

The team of more than 30 is key to the smooth day-to-day running of the House of Lords operations via continual coordination and communication with other departments both in the Lords and on a bicameral basis.

She is paid up to £93,000 a year.

References

Living people
Ushers of the Black Rod
1965 births
Officers of the Order of the British Empire
People educated at Wolverhampton Girls' High School
Alumni of the University of Roehampton
Alumni of the University of Leicester